Lists of viscountcies include:

 List of viscountcies in the peerages of Britain and Ireland
 List of viscounts in the peerages of Britain and Ireland
 List of viscountcies in Portugal